The Democratic and Social Movement (MDS) is a political party in Morocco.

History and profile
The party was founded on 15 June 1996, by a former police commissioner. It is described as a "royalist shell party".

In the parliamentary election held on 27 September 2002, the party won 7 out of 325 seats. In the next parliamentary election, held on 7 September 2007, the party won 9 out of 325 seats. In the parliamentary election took place in November 2011, the party won 2 out of 325 seats.

References

1996 establishments in Morocco
Monarchist parties
Political parties established in 1996
Political parties in Morocco